= La Rioja Province =

La Rioja Province may refer to:

- La Rioja Province, Argentina
- La Rioja Province, Spain
